Edwards Culver Kidd, Jr. (July 17, 1914 – December 4, 1995) was an American politician.

Biography 
Kidd was born in Milledgeville, Georgia. He went to Georgia Military College and graduated from Georgia Institute of Technology.

He served in the United States Army during World War II and was commissioned a major. Kidd was the owner of a drug store and was the president of a small loans company in Milledegeville, Georgia.

He served in the Georgia House of Representatives from 1947 to 1953 and from 1957 to 1963. Kidd served on the Baldwin County, Georgia commission from 1955 to 1964 and in the Georgia State Senate from 1962 to 1992 and was a Democrat.

His son Rusty Kidd also served in the Georgia General Assembly and his daughter Tillie Fowler served in the United States House of Representatives from Florida.

Notes

1914 births
1995 deaths
People from Milledgeville, Georgia
Military personnel from Georgia (U.S. state)
Businesspeople from Georgia (U.S. state)
Georgia Tech alumni
County commissioners in Georgia (U.S. state)
Democratic Party members of the Georgia House of Representatives
Democratic Party Georgia (U.S. state) state senators
20th-century American politicians
20th-century American businesspeople